Erwin von Sigel (14 August 1884 – 2 January 1967) was a German middle-distance runner. He competed in the men's 1500 metres at the 1912 Summer Olympics.

References

1884 births
1967 deaths
Athletes (track and field) at the 1912 Summer Olympics
German male middle-distance runners
Olympic athletes of Germany
Sportspeople from Bydgoszcz
German emigrants to the United States